Matthew I, (? – August 1410) was the Ecumenical Patriarch of Constantinople from 1397 to 1410, with a brief interruption in 1402–03.

Matthew entered a monastery as a fifteen-year old. He is known to have been a monk of the Charsianites Monastery at Constantinople by 1380, when he was ordained a deacon, eventually becoming its abbot in 1388. Matthew was a pupil of Mark, the abbot of the Kosmidion Monastery at Constantinople, and of Patriarch Nilus Kerameus. In 1387, during the latter's patriarchate, Matthew was elected Bishop of Cyzicus, but was apparently not consecrated. He concurrently served as locum tenens (proedros) of the Metropolis of Chalcedon until April 1389.

Through the support of Emperor Manuel II Palaiologos, he became Patriarch of Constantinople in October 1397, but soon encountered the opposition of the metropolitans Macarius of Ancyra, Matthew of Medea, and John Holobolos, who succeeded in deposing him during Manuel's absence in the West, in autumn 1402. On the emperor's return, Matthew was re-appointed (14 June 1403), and held the post until his death in August 1410.

References

Sources
 

14th-century births
1410 deaths
14th-century patriarchs of Constantinople
15th-century patriarchs of Constantinople
Bishops of Cyzicus
Year of birth unknown
Byzantine abbots